The Gray Dawn is a 1922 American silent drama film directed by Jean Hersholt and starring by Carl Gantvoort, Claire Adams and Robert McKim. Some scenes were also likely directed by others, including producer Benjamin B. Hampton. It is based on the 1915 novel of the same title by Stewart Edward White.

Plot
In San Francisco in the 1850s, the lawlessness of the western settlement is out of control. The District Attorney is under pressure from the corrupt mayor not to take action, leading to vigilante mobs.

Cast
 Carl Gantvoort as Milton Keith
 Claire Adams as Nan Bennett
 Robert McKim as Ben Sansome
 George Hackathorne as Calhoun Bennett
 Snitz Edwards as Krafft
 Stanton Heck as Casey
 Omar Whitehead as Charles Cora
 Claire McDowell as Mrs. Bennett
 Maude Wayne as Mimi Morrell
 J. Gunnis Davis as Mr. Morrell
 Zack Williams as Sam
 Grace Marvin as Mammy
 Charles Arling as Ned Coleman
 Harvey Clark as King of Wiolliam
 Charles Thurston as Marshal Richardson
 Marc B. Robbins as Chinaman 
 Charles Murphy as Bill Collector

References

Bibliography
 Munden, Kenneth White. The American Film Institute Catalog of Motion Pictures Produced in the United States, Part 1. University of California Press, 1997.

External links
 

1922 films
1922 drama films
American silent feature films
American black-and-white films
Films distributed by W. W. Hodkinson Corporation
American historical drama films
1920s historical drama films
Films set in the 1850s
Films set in San Francisco
Films based on American novels
1920s English-language films
1920s American films
Silent American drama films
Films with screenplays by Richard Schayer